The Angiana tree frog (Litoria angiana) is a species of frog in the subfamily Pelodryadinae. It is found in New Guinea. Its natural habitats are subtropical or tropical moist montane forests and rivers.

Description
There are several different polymorphs, with each given a different name in the Kalam language of Papua New Guinea Examples include:
 bright green polymorph; usually found in Saurauia spp. and Ficus dammaropsis
 dark green or black polymorph
 dark with reddish belly
 dull brown polymorph
 black polymorph

References

Litoria
Amphibians of New Guinea
Amphibians described in 1915
Taxonomy articles created by Polbot